Abshur Rural District is a rural district (dehestan) in Forg District, Darab County, Fars Province, Iran. At the 2006 census, its population was 10,639, in 2,153 families.  The rural district has 9 villages.

References 

Rural Districts of Fars Province
Darab County